The Mayor of Galway is the head of Galway City Council and first citizen of Galway, Ireland. This is a list of the mayors of Galway, from 1485 to the present.

"Tribes" period (1485–1654)

15th century

16th century

17th century

Commonwealth and Restoration (1654–1691)

Penal era (1692–1761)

Daly regime (1762–1840)

Galway Urban District Council
Galway Corporation was abolished in 1841 under the Municipal Corporations (Ireland) Act 1840. It became an urban district under the Local Government (Ireland) Act 1898. Its borough corporation was in 1937.

Mayoralty restored: Mayors since 1937

20th century

21st century

See also
List of rulers and officers of Galway 1230–1485

References

Sources
 "History of Galway", James Hardiman, 1820.
 "Blake Family Records", Vol. I, Martin J. Blake, 1902.

 
Galway
Lists of political office-holders in the Republic of Ireland
Mayors